The 1955–56 international cricket season was from September 1955 to April 1956.

Season overview

October

New Zealand in Pakistan

Ceylon in India

November

New Zealand in India

January

MCC in Pakistan

February

West Indies in New Zealand

References

International cricket competitions by season
1955 in cricket
1956 in cricket